The Young Columbians are a theater troupe established by Toby Orenstein in 1975 under the auspices of the Columbia Center for Theatrical Arts. It is a unique ensemble of talented youth aged 15–21.

History
The Young Columbians were founded in 1975, in anticipation of the bicentennial. The first performers to debut as the Young Columbians were a group of children aged 10 to 18, who toured stages across the country from 1975 to 1979 with a program of American patriotic songs. Their bicentennial show at the Lincoln Memorial in Washington, D.C., was aired on television. Time Magazine called the performance "one of the best productions of the bicentennial." A copy of that television program was placed in the nation's bicentennial time capsule.

Performances 
The Young Columbians have three shows developed by director Toby Orenstein. These include the Spirit of America, Broadway, and Christmas. Each performance includes a medley songs and dances from the corresponding era. Performance venues include the White House, Wolf Trap, Walt Disney World, The John F. Kennedy Center for the Performing Arts, Merriweather Post Pavilion, The Fillmore, Lake Kittamaqundi, Howard Community College, Toby's Dinner Theatre, The Ellipse, The Mall in Columbia, House of the Temple, the Washington D.C. Temple, and others.

Notable alumni 

 Edward Norton (Actor)
 Caroline Bowman (Broadway Actress)
 Steve Blanchard (Actor)
 Harolyn Blackwell (Opera Singer)
 Mary Page Keller (Television Actress)

See also

 Toby's Dinner Theatre
 Columbia Center for Theatrical Arts
 Theater in Washington, D.C.
 Greater Baltimore Theater Awards

References

External links
 Official website

Columbia, Maryland
Howard County, Maryland
Theatre companies in Maryland